Richard Bohslavsky (born 19 July 1904, date of death unknown) was an Austrian sports shooter. He competed in the 50 m rifle event at the 1948 Summer Olympics.

References

1904 births
Year of death missing
Austrian male sport shooters
Olympic shooters of Austria
Shooters at the 1948 Summer Olympics
Place of birth missing
20th-century Austrian people